Goodea gracilis, with the common name: dusky splitfin, is a species of freshwater fish in the family Goodeidae.

It is endemic to the Pánuco River system in central−eastern Mexico.

It grows to  total length.

References

gracilis
Freshwater fish of Mexico
Endemic fish of Mexico
Pánuco River
Natural history of San Luis Potosí
Natural history of Tamaulipas
Natural history of Veracruz
Endangered fish
Fish described in 1939
Taxonomy articles created by Polbot
Taxobox binomials not recognized by IUCN